The 84th season of the Campeonato Catarinense began on January 17, 2009, and ended on May 3, 2009.

Format

First stage
Teams are divided into a groups of ten teams.
One round-robin, in which all teams from one group play games against all teams within the group.

Second stage
Teams are divided into a groups of ten teams.
One round-robin, in which all teams from one group play games against all teams within the group.

Third stage
The group stage with four teams: the top 2 teams of each stage (with one bonus point) and the top 2 teams of two stages.
Two round-robin, in which all teams from one group play games against all teams within the group.

Four Stage:

Home-and-away playoffs with the top 2 teams of third stage.

The winner of the four stage was crowned the champion. The champions and the runner up qualified to Copa do Brasil 2010 and the champions qualified to Campeonato Brasileiro Série D 2009. The tree teams with the worst positions were released to Divisão Especial 2010.

Participating teams

Atlético de Ibirama - Ibirama
Atlético Tubarão - Tubarão
Avaí - Florianópolis
Brusque - Brusque ¹
Chapecoense - Chapecó
Criciúma - Criciúma
Figueirense - Florianópolis
Joinville - Joinville
Metropolitano - Blumenau
Marcílio Dias - Itajaí

¹ Divisão Especial 2008 Champion

First stage

Second stage

Confronts of two stages

 First Stage Games 
 Second Stage Games

General Standings

Third Stage

Confronts of Third Stage

 Turn Games 
 Return Games

Four Stage

* In Florianópolis, because the Avaí have better punctuation in the all stages.

Champion

Campeonato Catarinense seasons
Cat